Lowzdar or Luzdar may refer to:
 Lowzdar-e Olya
 Lowzdar-e Sofla
 Lowzdar-e Vosta